Events from the year 1555 in Sweden

Incumbents
 Monarch – Gustav I

Events

 - Instruction that the people in the Swedish province of Finland are going to be trained in defense against the Russians. 
 - A Description of the Northern Peoples by Olaus Magnus
 11 March - The Russo-Swedish War (1554–57): the Russian Empire breaks its 1537 treaty with Sweden by attacking Sweden, which results in the Russian defeat at the Battle of Kivinebb. 
 30 may - Introduction of the Internal passport.

Births

 - Axel Kurck, colonel   (died 1630)
 - Petrus Kenicius, Archbishop of Uppsala    (died 1636)

Deaths

References

External links

 
Years of the 16th century in Sweden
Sweden